Pure Ella is an Ella Fitzgerald CD released by MCA Records in 1994. She is accompanied by pianist Ellis Larkins. It combines Fitzgerald's 1950 album Ella Sings Gershwin with her 1954 album Songs in a Mellow Mood.

Track listing
"Someone to Watch Over Me" - 3:13
"My One and Only"  - 3:13
"But Not for Me"   - 3:12
"Looking For a Boy"   - 3:06
"I've Got a Crush on You"   - 3:13
"How Long Has This Been Going On?"   - 3:14
"Maybe" - 3:21
"Soon"  - 2:44
"I'm Glad There Is You" (Jimmy Dorsey, Paul Mertz) – 3:10
"What Is There to Say?" (Vernon Duke, Yip Harburg) – 3:22
"People Will Say We're in Love" (Oscar Hammerstein II, Richard Rodgers) – 3:12
"Please Be Kind" (Sammy Cahn, Saul Chaplin) – 3:36
"Until the Real Thing Comes Along" (Cahn, Chaplin, L.E. Freeman, Mann Holiner, Alberta Nichols) – 2:58
"Makin' Whoopee" (Walter Donaldson, Gus Kahn) – 3:07
"Imagination" (Johnny Burke, Jimmy Van Heusen) – 2:38
"Stardust" (Hoagy Carmichael, Mitchell Parish) – 4:03
"My Heart Belongs to Daddy" (Cole Porter) – 2:39
"You Leave Me Breathless" (Ralph Freed, Frederick Hollander) – 3:07
"Baby, What Else Can I Do?" (Walter Hirsch, Ralph Marks) – 3:50
"Nice Work If You Can Get It" (George Gershwin, Ira Gershwin) – 2:38

Ella Fitzgerald albums

de:Ella Sings Gershwin